Donna Jo Napoli (born February 28, 1948) is an American writer of children's and young adult fiction, as well as a linguist. She currently is a professor at Swarthmore College teaching Linguistics in all different forms (music, Theater (structure), dance, Comparative Literature Studies).She has also taught linguistics at Smith College, the University of North Carolina at Chapel Hill, Georgetown University, the University of Michigan at Ann Arbor, the University of Pennsylvania,

She has worked in syntax, phonetics, phonology, morphology, historical and comparative linguistics, Romance studies, structure of American Sign Language, poetics, writing for ESL students, and mathematical and linguistic analysis of folk dance. 
Her children's books have been translated into many languages, including different sign languages. Many of her children's books are retellings of fairy tales, including The Magic Circle, Crazy Jack, Spinners, Zel, Breath, Bound, Beast, and The Wager for older children, and The Prince of the Pond, Ugly, and Mogo the Third Warthog for younger children. Other children's stories are historical fiction based in Italy, including Daughter of Venice, For the Love of Venice, and The Smile. Napoli has won numerous awards for her work, including the Golden Kite Award given by the Society of Children’s Book Writers and Illustrators (for Stones in Water, and honor book Breath), the Sydney Taylor Award given by the Association of Jewish Libraries (for Stones in Water, and, honor book, The King of Mulberry Street and the Parents' Choice Gold Award (for Alligator Bayou and Silver awards for North and The King of Mulberry Street).

Her publications in linguistics include Syntactic argumentation (with Emily Rando). (Washington, DC: Georgetown Univ. Press, 1979), Syntax: Theory and Problems (Oxford: Oxford Univ. Press, 1993),  Linguistics: An introduction  (Oxford: Oxford Univ. Press, 1996), Humour in sign languages: The linguistic underpinnings (with Rachel Sutton-Spence) (Dublin: Trinity Press, 2009), and L'animale parlante ("The speaking animal") (2004), written with Marina Nespor, along with dozens of articles in the scholarly journals.

Early life 
Donna Jo Napoli was born the youngest of four children in Miami, February 28, 1948, to an Italian-American family. After correcting an eyesight problem left undiagnosed until the age of 10, Napoli became an avid reader. From then on she found solace in the escape provided by books, using reading as comfort during family troubles and instability stemming from her father's gambling problem. She was accepted to Harvard University for undergraduate education and received both her B.S. (Mathematics, 1970) and M.A./Ph.D. (Romance Languages, 1973). A postdoctoral fellowship in linguistics at M.I.T. in 1974 led to her resulting career in the field. She is married and has five children.

Napoli has dual citizenship in the U.S. and Italy.

Early linguistics career 
Napoli began her linguistics career in generative syntax, with a focus on Italian and other Romance languages. Her dissertation in 1973 was titled The Two Si's of Italian: An Analysis of Reflexive, Inchoative, and Indefinite Subject Sentences in Modern Standard Italian. Her subsequent work spanned many topics within generatic syntax on Romance languages and English, including its interfaces with intonation, morphology, and other areas.

Early writing career 
Although Napoli always had a love of writing, she decided not to pursue it as a career in early life. Her professional writing career began with the publication of her first book, The Hero of Barletta, in 1988. Napoli's novels tackle real-world problems children of any age may face, including family hardships, anxiety, phobias, and illness. As explained in a 2012 TED Talk, Napoli finds it important that children read stories about real-life problems they may face, to help comfort those who are experiencing similar difficulties.

Work with Deaf communities 
In the earlys 2000s, Donna Jo Napoli began a program of research on sign languages and developed connections within the Deaf community.

Napoli has contributed to linguistic research on sign languages, including the publication of the book Primary movement in sign languages in 2011.

Combining her interest in language and literature, Napoli has collaborated with others to create bimodal bilingual ebooks for hearing parents to read to their deaf children. These are ebooks and videos that are both conveyed in oral language, and conveyed in sign language in a video. Languages represented in this project include American Sign Language, Brazilian Sign Language, Fijian Sign Language, Korean Sign Language, Irish Sign Language, Nepali Sign Language, Swedish Sign Language, and others. The books are translated into the oral language relevant for each signed language.

Fiction books

Young Adult novels 

The Magic Circle, 1993 Dutton Penguin, 1995 Puffin Books (Paperback)
Zel, 1996 Dutton Penguin, 1998 Puffin Books (Paperback)
Song of the Magdalene, 1996 Scholastic, 1998 (Paperback), 2004 Simon & Schuster (Paperback)
Stones in Water, 1997, 1999 (Paperback) Dutton Penguin
For the Love of Venice, 1998, 2000 (Paperback) Delacorte Press
Sirena, 1998, 2000 (Paperback) Scholastic
Spinners, 1999, 2001 (Paperback) Dutton Penguin
Crazy Jack, 1999, 2001 (Paperback) Delacorte Press
Beast, 2000, 2002 (Paperback) Simon & Schuster
Daughter of Venice, 2002, 2003 (Paperback) Delacorte Press
The Great God Pan, 2003, 2005 (Paperback) Delacorte Press
Breath, 2003, 2005 (Paperback) Simon & Schuster
North, 2004, 2005 (Paperback) Greenwillow
Bound, 2004, 2006 Simon & Schuster
The King of Mulberry Street, 2005, 2007 (Paperback) Delacorte Press
Fire in the Hills, 2006, 2008 (Paperback) Dutton Press
Hush: An Irish Princess' Tale, 2007, 2008 (Paperback) Simon & Schuster
The Smile, 2008, 2009 (Paperback) Dutton Press
Alligator Bayou, 2009, 2010 (Paperback) Random House
The Wager, 2010, 2014 (Paperback) Henry Holt and Company
Skin, 2013 Skyscape
Storm, 2014 Simon & Schuster
Hidden: An Irish Princess' Tale, 2014 Paula Wiseman Books
Dark Shimmer, 2015 Random House

Elementary- and middle-school novels 

Soccer Shock, 1991 Dutton Penguin, 1993 Puffin Books (Paperback)
The Prince of the Pond, 1992 Dutton Penguin, 1994 Puffin Books (Paperback)
When the Water Closes over my Head, 1994 Dutton Penguin, 1996 Puffin Books (Paperback)
Shark Shock, 1994 Dutton Penguin, 1997 Puffin Books (Paperback)
The Bravest Thing, 1995 Dutton Penguin, 1997 Puffin Books (Paperback)
Jimmy, the Pickpocket of the Palace, 1995 Dutton Penguin, 1997 Puffin Books (Paperback)
On Guard, 1997 Dutton Penguin, 1999 Puffin Books (Paperback)
Trouble on the Tracks, 1998 Scholastic
Changing Tunes, 1998 Dutton Penguin, 2000 Puffin Books (Paperback)
Shelley Shock, 2000 Dutton Penguin, 2002 Puffin Books (Paperback)
Three Days, 2001 Dutton Penguin, 2003 Puffin Books (Paperback)
Gracie, the Pixie of the Puddle, 2004 Dutton Penguin
Sly the Sleuth and the Pet Mysteries, 2005 Dial Press, 2007 Scholastic (Paperback)
Ugly, 2006, 2008 (Paperback) Hyperion Books
Sly the Sleuth and the Sports Mysteries, 2006 Dial Press
Sly the Sleuth and the Food Mysteries, 2007 Dial Press
Mogo, the Third Warthog, 2008 Hyperion Books
Sly the Sleuth and the Code Mysteries, 2009 Dial Press
Lights On The Nile, 2011 HarperCollins
Treasury of Greek Mythology: Classic Stories of Gods, Goddesses, Heroes & Monsters, 2011 National Geographic
Treasury of Egyptian Mythology: Classic Stories of Gods, Goddesses, Monsters & Mortals, 2013 National Geographic
Treasury of Norse Mythology: Stories Of Intrigue, Trickery, Love & Revenge, 2015 National Geographic
Tales From the Arabian Nights: Stories of Adventure, Magic, Love, and Betrayal, 2016 National Geographic
Treasury of Bible Stories, 2019 National Geographic
Treasury of Magical Tales From Around the World, 2021 National Geographic
Words to Make a Friend, 2021 Random House Studio

The Angelwings Series 
Published by Simon & Schuster 1999-2001

Friends Everywhere
Little Creatures
On Her Own
One Leap Forward
Give and Take
No Fair!
April Flowers
Playing Games
Lies and Lemons
Running Away
Know-It-All
New Voices
Left Out
Happy Holidays
Partners
Hang In There

Picture books and early readers 

The Hero of Barletta, Illustrations by Dana Gustafson, Carolrhoda Books, 1988
Albert, Illustrations by Jim LaMarche, Harcourt, 2001
How Hungry are You?, Illustrations by Amy Walrod, Simon & Schuster, 2001
Rocky, the Cat who Barks, Illustrations by Tamara Petrosino, Dutton Children's Books, 2002
Flamingo Dream, Illustrated by Cathie Felstead, Greenwillow, 2002
Hotel Jungle, Illustrations by Kenneth J. Spengler, Mondo Publishing 2004
Pink Magic, Illustrations by Chad Cameron, Clarion Books, 2005
Bobby the Bold, Illustrations by Ard Hoyt, Dial Books for Young Readers, 2006
The Wishing Club: A Story About Fractions, Illustrations by Anna Currey, Henry Holt and Company, 2007
Corkscrew Counts: A Story About Multiplication, Illustrations by Anna Currey, Henry Holt and Company, 2008
Ready to Dream, Illustrations by Bronwyn Bancroft, Bloomsbury USA, 2009
The Earth Shook: A Persian Tale Illustrations by Gabi Swiatkowska Hyperion Books, 2009
Handy Stories to Read and Sign, Illustrations by Maureen Klusza, Gallaudet University Press, 2009
Mama Miti: Wangari Maathai and the Trees of Kenya, Illustrations by Kadir Nelson, Simon & Schuster, 2010
The Crossing, Illustrations by Jim Madsen, Simon & Schuster, 2011
A Single Pearl, Illustrations by Jim LaMarche, Hyperion Books, 2013
Hands & Hearts, Illustrations by Amy Bates, Abrams Books, 2014

As Night Falls: Creatures That Go Wild After, Illustrations by Felicita Sala, Random House Studio, 2023

eBooks 

Hang In There, 2015
Left Out, 2015
Partners, 2015
Happy Holidays, 2015
Know-It-All, 2015
No Fair!, 2015
Playing Games, 2015
April Flowers, 2015
One Leap Forward, 2015
Give And Take, 2015
On Her Own, 2015
Song Of The Magdalene, 2015
Friends Everywhere, 2015
Little Creatures, 2015

See also

References

External links
 
 Curriculum vitae
 Profile and Interview at TeenReads (2000)
 Donna Jo Napoli: A Hunger for Words, Scott Philips (September 19, 2006)
 Cover art and reviews at FantasyLiterature.net
 
 
 Mondo Publishing

20th-century American novelists
21st-century American novelists
American children's writers
American young adult novelists
Linguists from the United States
Smith College faculty
Swarthmore College faculty
Harvard University alumni
1948 births
Living people
University of Michigan faculty
American women novelists
Women writers of young adult literature
Novelists from Pennsylvania
Novelists from Massachusetts
Novelists from Michigan
Women linguists
20th-century American women writers
American women academics
21st-century American women writers
Fellows of the Linguistic Society of America